Yuriy Romanovych Izdryk  (Ukrainian: Юрій Романович Іздрик; born August 16, 1962, in Kalush, Ivano-Frankivsk Oblast, Ukrainian Soviet Socialist Republic) is a Ukrainian writer, poet and author of the conceptual magazine project Chetver, also known as Thursday.

He wrote the novels The Island of Krk (1994), Wozzeck & Woczkurgia (1996, 1997), Double Leon (2000) and AM™ (2004). He also wrote the poetry collection Stanislav and his 11 Liberators (1996), several collections of essays, and a number of short stories, articles on cultural studies and literary criticisms. Izdryk is also one of the founders of the Stanislav phenomenon, a group of postmodernist post-Soviet writers. He lives and works in his birthplace, Kalush.

Izdryk is also a visual artist and music composer, and has written stagings for theatrical plays.

Biography

Early life and education
Izdryk's father, Roman Andriyovych, spent his youth in the village of Gremyachinsk of the Perm region. He and five of his brothers and sisters were deported there with their mother while their father, Father Andriy Izdryk, was imprisoned in Stalinist concentration camps.

Izdryk excelled in school, especially in mathematics, and played in a school music ensemble. Around the same time, his interests in literature began, reading Vsevolod Nestayko, Stepan Rudansky, Aleksandr Kuprin, and the Great Soviet Encyclopedia. At age 14, he wrote his first poem in Russian. He was greatly inspired by the four-volume texts of Hemingway, which became "the first textbook of a true Ukrainian literary language", and made it clear that "all things, all emotions, all experiences, all, in general, can be translated into their native language".

Izdryk graduated from music school in cello and piano, and also played guitar and mandolin. After graduation, he entered the Lviv Polytechnic Institute's Faculty of Mechanics and Technology, where he studied art history, played in rock bands, and participated in productions of an amateur student theatre.

Early career
After graduating in 1984, Izdryk began working as an engineer at a machinery plant in Ivano-Frankivsk. In 1986, he transferred to the  Kalush Research Institute of the Khalkaria and worked there until 1990.

At the end of the 1980s, he participated in numerous official and unofficial artistic events and exhibitions and collaborated with the Komsomol oblast newspaper.

In 1989, he began work on the magazine Chetver. The first two editions were self-published. In 1990, at one of the artistic events (during the preparation of the biennial "Impreza" that took place in Ivano-Frankivsk), Izdryk met with Yurii Andrukhovych, which became a decisive factor in his life. He asked Andrukhovych to edit Chetver with him, and for several years the two artists worked on the magazine together.

Artistic establishment

Izdryk's first works appeared in the self-published editions of the magazines Chetver and Breaking (Poland). These included the serial The Last War and the poetic cycle Ten poems about the Motherland. The style of these early works led some critics to believe that Izdryk was a pseudonym of Andrukhovych, as certain stories, characters and phrases are similar – which later came to distinguish the creators of the Stanislav phenomenon. Over time, Izdryk declared himself an extraordinary artist, and plagiarism was dismissed.

Visual art briefly interrupted Izdryk's writing. He began to actively engage in painting, and participated in exhibitions between 1990 and 1994. He also engaged the artistic design of books and magazines and conducted personal exhibitions. His drawings were popular and he was able to make a living from them. For a time he was fascinated by theatre and wrote staging for The Cricket on the Hearth and The Catcher in the Rye, which were used by the Chernihiv regional youth theatre in the early 1990s.

In 1994, Izdryk returned to literary endeavours. His short story  appeared in the mainstream magazine  in 1994, and was received positively by critics. A Polish translation later appeared in the magazine Literatura na Świecie, and the story was featured in the 1998 collection The Island of Krk and Other Stories.

Izdryk published his first novel, Wozzeck, in 1998. He followed this with Double Leon in 2000 and AM™ in 2004. He continued to edit Chetver until its publication was suspended in 2008. In 2009, Izdryk published the collections of essays and sketches Flash 2GB and TAKE, for which he received a 2010 Book of the Year award from BBC-Ukraine. In 2011, Izdryk published Underwor(l)d, a collection of poetry and essays. In 2013, he published Izdryk. Yu a collection of poetry originally published in his blog, "Dead Diary".

Izdryk's focus returned to music.  He had written music cycles on poems by Andriyovych and Anna Kirpan. He collaborated on joint musical projects with poet and musician Hryhorii Semenchuk.

In 2014, while attending the International Scholarship for Poets, Meridian Czernowitz in Chernivtsi, Izdryk began collaborating on the Summa media project, which involves the constant communication of the authors with the audience. The end product of Summa was to be a book of the same name.

In June 2018, he recorded a videoconference in support of the Ukrainian director in prison, Oleh Sentsov.

Stanislav phenomenon

Izdryk is considered one of the primary representatives of the Stanislav phenomenon. According to Ukrainian literary scholars, the writers of the Stanislav phenomenon are the most representative branch of Ukrainian postmodern literature. In this form of postmodernism, authors try to answer the question of whether members of this group are really postmodernists, or if they are some type of modern avant-garde.

Works

Prose
"The Island of the Krk" (1993)
"Wozzeck & Woczkurgia" (1997)
"Double Leon" (2000)
"Another format: Yurko Izdryk" (Ivano-Frankivsk: Lilia-NW, 2003)
"AM™" (Lviv: Calvaria, 2004)
"3:1" is "Krk Island", "Wozzeck" and "Double Leon" (Kharkiv: "Family Leisure Club", 2009)
"TAKE" (Kharkiv: "Family Leisure Club", 2009).
"Flash-2GB" (Grani-T, 2009).
"Flash. Defragmentation "(" Such ", 2009)
"Nomination. All Prose of Izdryka "(Lviv:" The Publishing House of the Old Lion ", 2016)
"Summa" (with Evgeniya Nesterovich; Chernivtsi: Meridian Czernowitz, 2016)

Poetry
"Yu" (Lviv: "The Publishing House of the Old Lion", 2013)
"After prose" (Chernivtsi: Meridian Czernowitz, 2013)
"AB OUT" (Lviv: "Old Lion Publishing House", 2014)
"Calendar of Love" (Lviv: "Old Lion Publishing House", 2015)
"Papiorsi" (Chernivtsi: Meridian Czernowitz, 2017)
"Sloth and tender" (K .: A-ba-ba-ha-la-ma-ha, 2018)
"Smokes" [Dual-language edition: Ukrainian-English] (Sandpoint, Idaho: Lost Horse Press, 2019)

Essay
"Flash stick" (2007)
"Flash stick" – 2gb (K.: Grani-T, 2009)

References

External links

 Стаття про Іздрика у Глосарії Плероми
 Журнал «Четвер»
 Живопис Іздрика у колекції Гриньових. 
 ІЗДРИК. ВОЦЦЕК. "52 дні, 51 ніч" 
 ІЗДРИК. ТАКЕ. Теорія світла (2) 
 Юрій Іздрик та Євгенія Нестерович презентували медіапроект Summa

Interviews

 Юрко Іздрик: повернення «хрещеного батька» // "Дзеркало тижня", January 17, 2005
 Іздрик: я писав з насолодою, близькою до фізичної // BBCUkrainian.com, December 30, 2005
 Юрко Іздрик не любить солодке та пригадує, як «вср…ся» // Українська правда – Життя", October 22, 2008
 Поетичні identity Юрка Іздрика (Цитати з читань Іздрика в Могилянці April 7, 2011)
 «У політиці треба навчитися брехати» // Експрес, August 22, 2012.
 Just Іздрик. Розмовляла Євгенія Нестерович // Zbruch, 03.02.2014
 Юрій Іздрик: «Нереально щодня писати шедевр» // "Літакцент", July 10, 2014)

1962 births
Living people
Lviv Polytechnic alumni
People from Kalush, Ukraine
Ukrainian male poets
Ukrainian male writers
Counterculture of the 1990s